Dun Vulan Broch (Scottish Gaelic: 'Dùn Mhùlan' or 'Dùn Mhaoilinn') is an Iron Age broch in South Uist, Scotland.

Location
Dun Vulan is located in South Uist. The site is now situated on an exposed promontory but was originally on a freshwater lake.

Description
Dun Vulan is an Iron Age (c. 150–50 BC) broch located on the southern edge of the promontory; it is now protected as a sea wall. Excavations revealed an oval-shaped broch with a maximum diameter of 19.5 metres, with walls surviving to 4.5 metres in height and 4 metres in width.

History
Between June 1991 and July 1996 Dun Vulan was excavated as part of the SEARCH (Sheffield Environmental and Archaeological Research Campaign in the Hebrides) Project. The excavations suggested that there were no earlier structures predating the main structure on site.

References

External links

Brochs
Scheduled monuments in Scotland
Archaeological sites in the Outer Hebrides
South Uist